The Boston University Terriers women's hockey team represented Boston University in the 2011–12 NCAA Division I women's ice hockey season. The Terriers were coached by Brian Durocher. The seniors on the Terriers squad were Kasey Boucher, Jenn Wakefield, Carly Warren and Tara Watchorn. Boston University won its second Hockey East Championship in three seasons. In addition, the Terriers qualified for their third consecutive NCAA Tournament appearance. At season’s end, BU recorded a 23-14-1 record, marking the program’s second straight 20-win season. The club triumphed in seven of its final eight games of the year, while earning a fifth-place ranking.

Offseason

Recruiting

Exhibition

Regular season
In her Terriers debut on September 30, 2011, Isabel Menard logged three assists against North Dakota. The following day (also against North Dakota), Menard scored her first goal as a Terrier.
October 7:,A contest versus Niagara resulted in the first assist and goal of Kayla Tutino’s NCAA career. The first career point came on an assist, while she scored a shorthanded goal to help the Terriers to a 3-1 win.
October 15: Against the Union Dutchwomen, Kayla Tutino notched the first hat trick of her career in a 6-2 triumph. Team captain Jenn Wakefield notched a pair of goals. Jenelle Kohanchuk logged three assists. Jill Cardella and Kaleigh Fratkin each contributed with two assists. Goaltender Braly Hiller made 27 saves to gain the first win of her NCAA victory. Freshman Sarah Bayersdorfer recorded the first assist of her career.
From October 15 to 22, Kayla Tutino scored five goals in a three-game span.
November 19 and 20: Kayla Tutino scored the game-winning goals in both games. The first game-winning goal came in a 4-2 victory over the Connecticut Huskies, while the second came in a 3-2 win over Providence.
In a January 8, 2012 match versus the Maine Black Bears, Kayla Tutino scored the game-winning goal in a 2-1 victory.
January 25: Kerrin Sperry recorded her first shutout of the season as she logged 30 saves. In addition, Isabel Menard logged the 100th point of her NCAA career as the Terriers prevailed over the rival Boston College Eagles by a 6-0 tally.

Standings

Schedule

Conference record

Postseason

Awards and honors
Kerrin Sperry, Hockey East Defensive Player of the Week (Week of October 3, 2011)
Kerrin Sperry, Hockey East Defensive Player of the Week (Week of November 7, 2011)
Kristin Sperry, BU, Co-Hockey East Player of the Week (Week of January 31, 2011)
Kayla Tutino, Hockey East Rookie of the Week (Week of October 17, 2011) 
Kayla Tutino, Hockey East Player of the Week (Week of November 21, 2011)
Kayla Tutino, Runner-Up, Hockey East Player of the Month (Month of November 2011)
Kayla Tutino, Hockey East Rookie of the Week (Week of January 9, 2012) 
Kayla Tutino, Hockey East Rookie of the Week (Week of February 27, 2012)
Jennifer Wakefield, Hockey East Player of the Week (Week of October 3, 2011)
Jennifer Wakefield, Hockey East Player of the Month (Month of October 2011)
Jennifer Wakefield, Hockey East Player of the Week (Week of January 23, 2012)
Jennifer Wakefield, Hockey East Player of the Week (Week of February 27, 2012)
Jennifer Wakefield, Hockey East Scoring Champion (2011–12)
Boston University, Hockey East Team of the Week (Week of January 31, 2011)
Boston University, Hockey East Team of the Week (Week of February 27, 2012)

Team awards
Jill Cardella, co-recipient, Friends of Hockey Unsung Hero Award
Alissa Fromkin, Academic Honors Award
 Braly Hiller, Caroline Bourdeau Spirit Award
Shannon Mahoney, Most improved player
Marie-Philip Poulin co-recipient, Terriers Most Valuable Player Award
Marie-Philip Poulin, co-recipient, Strength and Conditioning Athlete of the Year
Kerrin Sperry, co-recipient,  Strength and Conditioning Athlete of the Year
Jenn Wakefield, co-recipient, Terriers Most Valuable Player Award
Louise Warren, co-recipient, Friends of Hockey Unsung Hero Award

References

Boston University Terriers women's ice hockey seasons
Boston University